Hans "Buffy" Ettmayer (born 23 July 1946) is an Austrian retired footballer and coach. He lives in Notzingen.

References

External links
 Hans Ettmayer at Austria Archiv 
 Hans Ettmayer at austriasoccer.at 
 
 

1946 births
Living people
Footballers from Vienna
Austrian footballers
Austria international footballers
Association football midfielders
Bundesliga players
2. Bundesliga players
FK Austria Wien players
VfB Stuttgart players
Hamburger SV players
FC Lugano players
Austrian football managers
Freiburger FC players